A referendum on political and economic reforms was held in Poland on 29 November 1987. The government's aim in holding the referendum was to obtain a mandate for difficult economic and political reforms. Around a third of eligible voters did not participate, defying the regime. Only 44% of Poland's 26 million eligible voters voted yes to the question on economic reform, and 46% voted yes to the second question on "democratisation" in Poland. Even though a majority of the votes cast supported the propositions, according to the rules of the referendum the majority of eligible voters had to vote yes in order for the referendum to pass. The resulting failure of the referendum was unprecedented, as it was the first time that Communist authorities in Eastern Europe had lost a vote.

Questions
Voters were presented with two questions:
Are you for the support of radical economic reform?
Are you for a deep democratisation of the political life?

The first proposal would allow the government to carry out the "full government program for radical economic recovery," aimed at "improving living conditions," on the understanding that this would require a "difficult" two-to-three-year period of "rapid changes." The second would lead to the introduction a new "Polish model" for "democratising political life, aimed at strengthening self-government, extending the rights of citizens and increasing their participation" in running the country.

Results

Question I

Question II

References

Solidarity (Polish trade union)
Referendums in Poland
1987 referendums
1987 in Poland
Reform in Poland
November 1987 events in Europe